Sangaré Niamoto Ba (born 22 April 1955) is a Malian former minister and politician.

Life
Ba was born in Bamako in 1955. She went to Cheikh Anta Diop University in Dakar. She joined the ministry in Mali in 1982.

In 2009, she became secretary general in the Ministry of Economy and Finance. In 2011, she was asked to lead the Ministry of Industry, Investment and Commerce. She was minister until 2012.

Family
She is married and had four children.

References

1955 births
Living people
People from Bamako
Malian politicians
Cheikh Anta Diop University alumni
21st-century Malian people